Eduardo Jonatan Schwank (also known as Schwanka; born 23 April 1986) is a retired professional tennis player from Argentina. In 2011, he reached the finals of the French Open in men's doubles partnering Juan Sebastian Cabal and of the US Open in mixed doubles partnering Gisela Dulko. He was coached by Javier Nalbandian, the brother of David Nalbandian.

Schwank's family background is from the German-speaking part of Switzerland.

Junior career
In his final year on the junior circuit in 2004, Schwank had a record of 39-4 winning five tournaments, with his biggest title the Banana Bowl defeating Pablo Andújar in the final. Schwank finished no. 2 in the rankings behind Gaël Monfils.

Professional career

2006
In 2006, he won four consecutive Futures events: the former two in Argentina, the latter two in Bolivia.

2007
In 2007 he won a Challenger title in Medellín, defeating Chris Guccione in the final. He also won three consecutive Futures events. He won the bronze medal in singles and the gold medal in men's doubles at the 2007 Pan American Games in Rio de Janeiro.

2008
In April 2008, Schwank won two consecutive Challenger events, the first in Cremona, Italy and the second in Rome, Italy. On May 12, 2008, a hotel in which Schwank was staying while competing in a Challenger event in Bordeaux, France caught fire. Schwank's room was engulfed by the blaze, which destroyed his laptop, his passport, as well as the prize money he had earned from the Rome Challenger tournament. Schwank was not in his room at the time. He ended up winning the tournament, making that his third consecutive Challenger title.

He was involved in a legal battle after reportedly being accused of responsibility for the blaze by leaving an oven switched on in his room. He denied the charges.

At the 2008 French Open, Schwank defeated former world no. 1 Carlos Moyà in the first round. He was also victorious in his next match, but was defeated in the third round by Paul-Henri Mathieu in four sets.

2011
Schwank reached the final of the French Open in men's doubles partnering Juan Sebastian Cabal. In the final, they lost to Max Mirnyi and Daniel Nestor in three tight sets with a tiebreak in the first set. He also reached the final of the US Open in mixed doubles partnering Gisela Dulko. They lost to Jack Sock and Melanie Oudin in a super-tiebreak.

2012
In 2012, Schwank qualified for the French Open and advanced to the third round, where he lost to Rafael Nadal. He also teamed with Gisela Dulko in mixed doubles, and they beat Serena Williams and Bob Bryan in the first round. Schwank, partnering Juan Ignacio Chela, reached third round of Wimbledon 2012 doubles and lost to Daniele Bracciali and Julian Knowle.  At the 2012 Summer Olympics, he partnered with David Nalbandian in the men's doubles, but they were knocked out in the first round.

Grand Slam finals

Doubles: 1 (0–1)

Mixed doubles: 1 (0–1)

ATP career finals

Doubles: 3 (1 title, 2 runners-up)

Team competition finals: 1 (1 runner-up)

ATP Challenger and ITF Futures finals

Singles: 27 (16–11)

Doubles: 29 (21–8)

Performance timelines

Singles

Doubles

References

External links

 
 
 
 
 
 
 Schwank world ranking history

1986 births
Living people
Argentine male tennis players
Argentine people of German descent
Argentine people of Swiss descent
Pan American Games gold medalists for Argentina
Sportspeople from Rosario, Santa Fe
Argentine people of Swiss-German descent
Tennis players at the 2007 Pan American Games
Tennis players at the 2012 Summer Olympics
Olympic tennis players of Argentina
Tennis players at the 2011 Pan American Games
Pan American Games bronze medalists for Argentina
Pan American Games medalists in tennis
Medalists at the 2007 Pan American Games